An extracapsular fracture is a bone fracture near a joint but still located outside the joint capsule.

Examples of extracapsular fractures are intertrochanteric and subtrochanteric hip fractures.

See also
 Intracapsular fracture

References

Bone fractures